Listed below are the dates and results for the 1974 FIFA World Cup qualification rounds for the African zone (CAF). For an overview of the qualification rounds, see the article 1974 FIFA World Cup qualification.

A total of 22 CAF teams entered the competition (two withdrew). The African Zone was allocated 1 place (out of 16) in the final tournament.

Format
There would be four rounds of play:
 First Round, Second Round and Third Round: In each of these rounds, the teams were paired up to play knockout matches on a home-and-away basis. The winners would advance to the next round, until there would be 3 teams left.
 Final Round: The 3 teams would play against each other on a home-and-away basis. The group winner would qualify.

First round

|}

Morocco won 2–1 on agg. and advanced to the Second Round.

Guinea won 5–2 on agg. and advanced to the Second Round.

Tunisia won 3–2 on agg. and advanced to the Second Round.

Ivory Coast won 3–0 on agg. and advanced to the Second Round.

Kenya won 2–1 on agg. and advanced to the Second Round.

The aggregate score was tied 1–1, and a play-off was played to decide who would advance to the Second Round.

Ethiopia advanced to the Second Round, via the play-off.

Zambia won 6–1 on agg. and advanced to the Second Round.

Nigeria won 3–2 on agg. and advanced to the Second Round.

Ghana won 10–1 on agg. and advanced to the Second Round.

Zaire won 4–0 on agg. and advanced to the Second Round.

Madagascar withdrew, so Mauritius advanced to the Second Round automatically.

Gabon withdrew, so Cameroon advanced to the Second Round automatically.

Second round

|}

Morocco won 3–1 on agg. and advanced to the Third Round.

Ivory Coast won 3–2 on agg. and advanced to the Third Round.

Kenya won 5–3 on agg. and advanced to the Third Round.

Zambia won 4–2 on agg. and advanced to the Third Round.

Ghana won 2–0 on agg. and advanced to the Third Round.

The aggregate score was tied 1–1, and a play-off was played to decide who would advance to the Third Round.

Zaire advanced to the Third Round.

Third round

|}

Morocco won 5–2 on agg. and advanced to the Final Round.

Zambia won 4–2 on agg. and advanced to the Final Round.

Zaire won 4–2 on agg. and advanced to the Final Round.

Final round

Zaire qualified.

Qualified teams

1 Bold indicates champions for that year. Italic indicates hosts for that year.

Goalscorers

6 goals

 William Ouma
 Kembo Uba Kembo

5 goals

 Kwasi Owusu
 Ahmed Faras

4 goals

 Kakoko Etepé
 Jean-Kalala N'Tumba

3 goals

 Tariku Ingdawerk
 Moustapha Choukri
 Freddie Mwila
 Moses Simwala
 Brighton Sinyangwe

2 goals

 Noël Kouamé
 Bernard N'Guessan
 Mama Ouattara
 Abwcari Gariba
 Osei Kofi
 Ibrahim Sunday
 Chérif Souleymane
 Daniel Jean Robert Imbert
 Yakubu Mambo
 Kenneth Olayombo
 Ezzedine Chakroun
 Mohieddine Habita
 Bernard Chanda
 Godfrey Chitalu
 Joseph Mapulanga

1 goal

 Rabah Gamouh
 Mokhtar Kalem
 Paul-Gaston Ndongo
 Jean-Michel M'Bono
 Noël Minga
 Kouman Kobinam
 Laurent Pokou
 Damien Kamilou
 Sayed Abdelrazak
 Ali Khalil
 Tekeste Gebremedhin
 Kassahun Teka
 Seyoum Tesfaye
 Akuetteh Armah
 Joseph Ghartey
 Clifford Odame
 Joseph Sam
 Maxime Camara
 Smith Samuel
 Petit Sory
 Soriba Soumah
 Daniel Anyanzwa
 Peter Ouma
 John Shore
 Ramoseli Thietsi
 Anwar Jackaria
 Hassan Amcharrat
 Chérif Fetoui
 Maouhoub Ghazouani
 Mohamed Maghfour
 Sunday Oyarekhua
 Louis Gomis Diop
 Izzeldin Osman
 Nassoro Mashoto
 Abdesselam Adhouma
 Mbungu Ekofa
 Mavuba Mafuila
 Mayanga Maku
 Kamunda Tshinabu
 Obby Kapita
 Simon Kaushi
 Burton Mugala
 Boniface Simutowe

See also

1974 FIFA World Cup qualification
1974 FIFA World Cup qualification (UEFA)
1974 FIFA World Cup qualification (CONCACAF)
1974 FIFA World Cup qualification (CONMEBOL)
1974 FIFA World Cup qualification (AFC and OFC)

References

CAF
FIFA World Cup qualification (CAF)
Qual
Qual